Frank Watson (6 January 1923 – 30 August 2016), also known by the nickname of "Shanks", was an English professional rugby league footballer who played in the 1940s and 1950s, and coached in the 1950s and 1960s.

Background
Watson was born in Hunslet, West Riding of Yorkshire, England, he worked as a bus conductor, and he died aged 93 in the Alexander Care Home, Victoria Road, Morley, West Yorkshire, England.

Playing career
Watson represented Yorkshire while at Hunslet. He played in Hunslet's 18-10 victory over New Zealand during the 1947–48 New Zealand rugby tour of Great Britain and France match at Parkside, Hunslet during October 1947. Watson appeared in a Great Britain trial match in advance of the 1946 Great Britain Lions tour while at Hunslet, but ultimately he was not selected for the tour, he made his début for Leeds in the 21-13 victory over Hunslet at Parkside, Hunslet on Saturday 1 October 1949, he broke right-ankle in 1951, he played his last game for the Leeds on Saturday 8 October 1955.

Coaching career
Watson was the player-coach of Leeds' A-Team that included the future 'This Sporting Life' author David Storey, and was the coach of Batley from June 1958 to June 1962.

Personal life
He was married to Lilian (née Duffy).

References

External links
Search for "Watson" at rugbyleagueproject.org

Lazenby Cup To Be Presented By Frank Watson (14 January 2011)
Search for "Frank Watson" at britishnewspaperarchive.co.uk
Search for "Shanks Watson" at britishnewspaperarchive.co.uk

1923 births
2016 deaths
Batley Bulldogs coaches
English rugby league coaches
English rugby league players
Hunslet F.C. (1883) players
Leeds Rhinos players
People from Hunslet
Rugby league centres
Rugby league players from Leeds
Rugby league halfbacks
York Wasps players
Yorkshire rugby league team players